First Cellular of Southern Illinois was a telecommunications company in Illinois, United States.

Services included: 
Owned and Operated Wireless phone carrier
At its time, the largest digital network in area served with significant market share.
Extensive nationwide network by partnering with multiple companies across the United States
Sponsorship of local arts and education programs as well as wireless phone donations to area shelters. 

The company was purchased by Alltel in an all-cash deal; the acquisition closed on May 1, 2006.  Complete turnover of all stores occurred in early October.

External links
Acquisition article
Company website
Acquisition press release

Defunct mobile phone companies of the United States
Communications in Illinois
Defunct companies based in Illinois
Telecommunications companies disestablished in 2006
Alltel